The Bhagalpur–Muzaffarpur Jan Sewa Express is an Express train belonging to Eastern Railway zone that runs between  and  in India. It is currently being operated with 13419/13420 train numbers on a daily basis.

Service
The 13419/Jan Sewa Express has an average speed of 38 km/hr and covers 240 km in 6h 35m. The 13420/Jan Sewa Express has an average speed of 35 km/hr and covers 240 km in 6h 50m.

Route and halts 
The important halts of the train are:

Coach composition
The train has standard ICF rakes with max speed of 110 kmph. The train consists of 17 coaches :
 1 3Tier AC coach
 3 Sleeper Coaches
 11 General
 2 Seating cum Luggage Rake

Traction
Both trains are hauled by a Jamalpur Loco Shed-based WDM-3A or WDP-4D diesel locomotive from Bhagalpur to Muzaffarpur and vice versa.

See also 
 Bhagalpur Junction railway station
 Muzaffarpur Junction railway station
 Saharsa–Amritsar Jan Sewa Express

Notes

References

External links 
 13419/Jan Sewa Express India Rail Info
 13420/Jan Sewa Express India Rail Info

Transport in Bhagalpur
Transport in Muzaffarpur
Express trains in India
Rail transport in Bihar
Named passenger trains of India